The Intermontane Islands were a giant chain of active volcanic islands somewhere in the Pacific Ocean during the Triassic time beginning around 245 million years ago. Over early Jurassic time the Intermontane Islands and the Pacific Northwest drew closer together as the continent moved west and the Intermontane Plate subducted. About 180 million years ago in the Mid-Jurassic time the last of the Intermontane Plate subducted and the Intermontane Islands collided with the Pacific Northwest, forming parts of British Columbia, Canada. The Intermontane Islands were too big to sink beneath the continent, and welded onto the continent, forming the Intermontane Belt. Geologists call the ocean that existed between the Intermontane Islands and North America the Slide Mountain Ocean.

See also
Island arc
Insular Islands
Intermontane Plate
Intermontane Belt

External links
Burke Museum - University of Washington

Former islands of Canada
Volcanic arc islands
Natural history of British Columbia
Geology of British Columbia
Triassic paleogeography
Jurassic paleogeography